James Watson Gerard III (August 25, 1867 – September 6, 1951) was a United States lawyer, diplomat, and justice of the New York Supreme Court.

Early life
Gerard was born in Geneseo, New York.  His father, James Watson Gerard Jr., was a lawyer and Democratic Party politician in New York. and his grandfather, also James Watson Gerard, was a noted trial lawyer and civic reformer in New York.

He graduated from Columbia University (A.B. 1890; A.M. 1891) and from New York Law School (LL.B. 1892).

Career
Gerard was chairman of the Democratic campaign committee of New York County for four years. He served on the National Guard of the State of New York for four years. He served through the Spanish–American War (1898) on the staff of General McCoskry Butt. From 1900 to 1904, he was quartermaster, with the rank of major, of the 1st Brigade of the Guard. He was elected to the New York Supreme Court in 1907, where he served as a judge until 1911.

U.S. Ambassador to Germany
Under President Woodrow Wilson, Gerard served as the American Ambassador to Germany from 1913 to 1917.

In 1914, Gerard was the Democratic (Tammany Hall) candidate for U.S. Senator from New York. He defeated the Anti-Tammany candidate, Franklin D. Roosevelt, in the Democratic primary, but lost the election to James W. Wadsworth, Jr.

At the outbreak of World War I, in 1914, Gerard assumed the care of British interests in Germany, later visited the camps in which British prisoners were confined, and did much to alleviate their condition. His responsibilities were further increased by the fact that German interests in France, Britain, and Russia were placed in the care of the American embassies in those countries, which made the American embassy in Berlin become a sort of clearing house. From first-hand knowledge, he settled the question, much disputed among the Germans themselves, as to the official attitude of the German government toward the violation of Belgian neutrality.

At the request of Gottlieb von Jagow, after the fall of Liège, Gerard served as intermediary for offering the Belgians peace and indemnity if they would grant passage of German troops through their country. On August 10, 1914, the Kaiser placed in Gerard's hands a telegram addressed personally to Wilson that declared that Belgian neutrality "had to be violated by Germany on strategical grounds." At the request of a high German official, the telegram was not made public as the Kaiser had wished but was sent privately to the President. After the sinking of the RMS Lusitania with many U.S. residents on board, on May 7, 1915, Gerard's position became more difficult.

The German government asked him to leave the country in January 1917. Diplomatic relations were broken off on February 3, and he left Germany. He was detained for a time because of rumors that the German ambassador in America was being mistreated and that German ships had been confiscated. When the rumors were disproved, he was allowed to depart. He retired from diplomatic service in July 1917.

Later career
He took up the practice of law in New York City.  The George H. Doran Company of New York City published two books Gerard wrote on his experiences, My Four Years in Germany, released in 1917, and the following year, Face to Face with Kaiserism. My Four Years in Germany was filmed in 1918.
Gerard was of major incidental importance in the rise of Warner Brothers movie producers as his book My Four Years in Germany was the source of the Warner's first nationally-syndicated film of the same name.

Gerard once said in a speech, "The Foreign Minister of Germany once said to me 'your country does not dare do anything against Germany, because we have in your country five hundred thousand Germans reservists [emigrants] who will rise in arms against your government if you dare to make a move against Germany.' Well, I told him that that might be so, but that we had five hundred thousandand onelamp posts in this country, and that that was where the reservists would be hanging the day after they tried to rise."

Upon returning to the U.S., Gerard went back to practicing law. He remained heavily involved in Democratic politics. He was the treasurer for the Democratic National Committee (1924–1932) and played a leading role in the nomination of Roosevelt for president in 1932. After an unsuccessful campaign for U.S. President in 1920, Gerard ceased active pursuit of elected office but accepted a central role in U.S. Democratic Party politics as a public speaker, fundraiser, consultant, and mass media contributor.

In 1933, Gerard reviewed Adolf Hitler's Mein Kampf for The New York Times Book Review. His critique occupied the entire front page of the section and continued inside. "Hitler is doing much for Germany," Gerard began, citing "his unification of the Germans, his destruction of communism, his training of the young, his creation of a Spartan State animated by patriotism, his curbing of parliamentary government, so unsuited to the German character; his protection of the right of private property," which he said "are all good". But he went on to condemn Hitler's anti-Semitism. "We have all of us a right to criticize, to boycott a nation which reverts to the horrible persecutions of the Dark Ages, we have a right to form a blockade of public opinion about this misguided country," he wrote. Gerard concluded, "It is with sadness, tinged with fear for the world's future, that we read Hitler's hymn of hate against that race which has added so many names to the roll of the great in science, in medicine, in surgery, in music and the arts, in literature and all uplifting human endeavor."

Gerard's final book was an autobiography, My First Eighty-Three Years in America (1951).

Personal life
Gerard's wife, the former Mary Augusta Daly (called “Molly”), was the daughter of copper magnate Marcus Daly, head of the Anaconda Copper Mining Company that developed the mines of Butte, Montana, and built the town of Anaconda, Montana.  They had no children. After both of Mary's parents died, she was one of the heirs to the Daly ranch, the Bitter Root Stock Farm, north of Hamilton, Montana, where the couple had frequently visited. Gerard oversaw a number of the legal interests of the Daly family, and he purchased a cattle ranch of his own in the area. Today the University of Montana holds his collected papers.

He died September 6, 1951, in Southampton, New York. He was interred at Green-Wood Cemetery in Brooklyn, New York City.

Notes

References

Further reading
 Barthold, Theodore Richard. "Assignment to Berlin: the embassy of James W. Gerard, 1913-1917" (PhD Temple University, 1981). online
 Flanagan, Jason C. "Woodrow Wilson's" Rhetorical Restructuring": The Transformation of the American Self and the Construction of the German Enemy." Rhetoric & Public Affairs 7.2 (2004): 115-148. online
 Mitchell, Charles Reed. "New Message To America: James W. Gerard's 'Beware' and World War I Propaganda" Journal of Popular Film (1975) 4#5 pp 275–295.

Primary sources
 Gerard, James W. My four years in Germany (1917) online
 Gerard, James W. Face to Face with Kaiserism (1918) online
 Gerard, James Watson. My first eighty-three years in America: the memoirs of James W. Gerard (Doubleday, 1951).

External links

  
 
 
 International Radio Journalism: History, Theory and Practice (1998)
 James Watson Gerard Papers (University of Montana Archives)

New York (state) state court judges
Ambassadors of the United States to Germany
American memoirists
Columbia University alumni
New York Law School alumni
Candidates in the 1920 United States presidential election
Candidates in the 1924 United States presidential election
20th-century American politicians
1867 births
1951 deaths
Burials at Green-Wood Cemetery
20th-century American diplomats
Democratic National Committee treasurers